The Silkworm (Italian: Il baco da seta) is a 1973 Italian thriller film directed by  Mario Sequi and starring  Nadja Tiller, George Hilton and Riccardo Garrone.

It was shot at the Tirrenia Studios and on location in Livorno and Florence. The film's sets were designed by the art director Elio Balletti.

Cast
 Nadja Tiller as Smeralda Amadier 
 George Hilton as Didier 
 Riccardo Garrone as Commissario Guarnieri 
 Guy Madison as Robert 
 Evi Marandi as Yvonne 
 Evi Rigano as Marcelle 
 Mario Feliciani  as Avv. Planget 
 Osvaldo Ruggieri  as Raffaele 
 Carlos de Castro as Anastasios Kuskas 
 Vivi Gioi  as Costa's ex lover

References

Bibliography 
 Vito Zagarrio. Argento vivo: il cinema di Dario Argento tra genere e autorialità. Marsilio, 2008.

External links 
 

1973 films
Italian thriller films
1970s thriller films
1970s Italian-language films
Films directed by Mario Sequi
Films shot at Tirrenia Studios
Films set in Livorno
Films set in Florence
1970s Italian films